Acrocercops polyclasta is a moth of the family Gracillariidae, known from Uttarakhand, India. It was described by Edward Meyrick in 1919.

References

polyclasta
Moths of Asia
Moths described in 1919